Albert Hewitt (21 January 1866 – 15 July 1947) was an Australian cricketer. He played in two first-class matches for Queensland between 1897 and 1900.

See also
 List of Queensland first-class cricketers

References

External links
 

1866 births
1947 deaths
Australian cricketers
Queensland cricketers
Cricketers from New South Wales